Cody Lake is a lake in Rice County, in the U.S. state of Minnesota.

Cody Lake was named for Patrick Cody, an early settler.

See also
List of lakes in Minnesota

References

External links
 Cody Lake, Lakefinder, Minnesota Department of Natural Resources

Lakes of Minnesota
Lakes of Rice County, Minnesota